Rodney Alan Adams Jr. (born September 15, 1994) is an American football wide receiver who is a free agent. He played college football at South Florida, and was drafted by the Minnesota Vikings in the fifth round of the 2017 NFL Draft.

College career
Adams played college football at South Florida, after transferring from  Toledo. During his senior season, he set a school record with 67 receptions and tied his own single-season record with 822 receiving yards. He caught five touchdowns. During his collegiate career, Adams caught 16 touchdowns which is second in school history. Adams was also a kick return specialist with 1,140 yards on 46 returns, including a 97-yard kickoff return for a touchdown.

Statistics

Professional career

Minnesota Vikings
Adams was drafted by the Minnesota Vikings in the fifth round, 170th overall, in the 2017 NFL Draft. He was waived by the Vikings on October 30, 2017 and was re-signed to the practice squad.

Indianapolis Colts
On February 2, 2018, Adams signed a reserve/future contract with the Indianapolis Colts. He was placed on the reserve/retired list on April 9, 2018.

Adams was reinstated from the reserve/retired list to the active roster on January 29, 2020. He was waived on August 2, 2020.

Chicago Bears
Adams signed with the Chicago Bears on August 20, 2020. He was released as part of final roster cuts on September 5, and was added to the practice squad a day later. On January 11, 2021, Adams signed a reserve/futures contract with the Bears.

On August 31, the Bears announced Adams made the 53 man roster, marking the first time since 2017 Adams had been on an NFL roster. However, he was released the following day after roster restructuring and placed on the team's practice squad. Adams made his regular season debut for the Bears on December 5 against the Arizona Cardinals. As a member of the practice squad, he became a free agent following Week 17.

New York Jets
Adams was signed to a reserve/futures contract by the New York Jets on January 13, 2022. He was waived with a non-football injury designation on May 23, 2022.

Personal life
Adams' mother, Michelle Conway Scott, died in a car accident in 2013. Since the accident, Adams has dedicated his career to his mother. Adams became the legal guardian of his brother, Antonio Blount, who was 16 at the time. He was granted a hardship and transferred from Toledo to South Florida to finish his college football career.

References

External links
South Florida Bulls bio

1994 births
Living people
American football wide receivers
Toledo Rockets football players
South Florida Bulls football players
Minnesota Vikings players
Players of American football from St. Petersburg, Florida
Indianapolis Colts players
Chicago Bears players